Nikola Danilovski (born 1 February 1997 - 29 May 2021) was a Macedonian handball player.

He participated at the 2017 Men's Junior World Handball Championship.

References

http://24rakomet.mk/%D0%B4%D0%B0%D0%BD%D0%B8%D0%BB%D0%BE%D0%B2%D1%81%D0%BA%D0%B8-%D1%81%D0%B5-%D0%B2%D1%80%D0%B0%D1%82%D0%B8-%D0%B2%D0%BE-%D0%BC%D0%B5%D1%82%D0%B0%D0%BB%D1%83%D1%80%D0%B3-%D0%BE%D0%B2%D0%B0-%D0%B5-%D1%87/

1997 births
Living people
Macedonian male handball players
Sportspeople from Skopje
Mediterranean Games competitors for North Macedonia
Competitors at the 2018 Mediterranean Games